"Contre nature" (meaning "Against Nature") is the third (but promotional only) single from Celine Dion's 2003 album, 1 fille & 4 types. It was released on 29 March 2004 in Francophone countries. "Contre nature" was written by Jacques Veneruso, who has also composed other French hits for Dion, such as "Sous le vent" and "Tout l'or des hommes."

Background and release

On 1 October 2003 Dion taped the 1 fille & 4 types TV special at the Caesars Palace in Las Vegas, where she performed this song among others.

The music video, directed by Didier Kerbrat, was filmed on 27 March 2004 in the Mojave Desert and released on 26 April 2004. It was included on Dion's 2005 DVD, called On ne change pas. The making of "Contre nature" video was also included there as a DVD bonus.

The song was popular in Quebec, reaching number 2.

"Contre nature" was included later as a bonus track on the French edition of A New Day... Live in Las Vegas album.

It was also featured on Dion's greatest hits compilation On ne change pas in 2005.

Track listing and formats
 French promotional CD single
 "Contre nature" (Radio Edit) – 3:33
 French promotional DVD single
 "Contre nature" (Behind the Scenes) – 15:30
 "Contre nature" (Music Video) – 4:12

Charts

References

~

Celine Dion songs
2004 singles
French-language songs
Pop ballads
Songs written by Jacques Veneruso
2003 songs
Columbia Records singles
Epic Records singles